Water parsley is a common name for several species of plants and may refer to:

Apium nodiflorum (Apiaceae), native to Africa, western Asia, and Europe
Oenanthe (plant), primarily:
Oenanthe javanica (Apiaceae), native to eastern Asia
Oenanthe sarmentosa (Apiaceae), native to western North America